The Temuka River, originally Te Umu Kaha River, is a river of the Canterbury region of New Zealand's South Island. It is one of numerous rivers which meet close to the south Canterbury town of Temuka, all of which are part of the Opihi River's system.

See also
List of rivers of New Zealand

References

Rivers of Canterbury, New Zealand
Rivers of New Zealand